Gayle Elizabeth Smith (born February 23, 1956) is the CEO of the One Campaign. Smith was formerly Coordinator for Global COVID Response and Health Security at the U.S. Department of State. and was the former Administrator of the United States Agency for International Development (USAID).

Early life and education
Smith is from Bexley, Ohio, a suburb of Columbus, Ohio.

In 1974, Smith graduated from Bexley High School. In 1978, she received a B.A. from the University of Colorado Boulder in English.

Career

After college, Smith worked as a journalist for over 20 years, where she was based in Africa and wrote for publications like BBC News and the Financial Times.

From 1994 to 1998, Smith served as Senior Advisor to the Administrator and Chief of Staff for U.S. Agency for International Development (USAID).

From 1998 to 2001, she was Special Assistant to President Bill Clinton and Senior Director for African Affairs at the U.S. National Security Council.

In 2001, Smith became a Senior Fellow at the Center for American Progress. As part of this position, she worked on the Sustainable Security Project and co-founded the ENOUGH Project, working as Co-Chair, as well as the Modernizing Foreign Assistance Network. The ENOUGH Project was created to end genocide and crimes against humanity.

From 2005 to 2007, Smith was the Chairman of the Working Group Chair on Global Poverty for the Clinton Global Initiative.

In 2009, Smith joined the U.S. National Security Council, where she was Special Assistant to President Obama and Senior Director for Development and Democracy, where her focus was on global development and humanitarian assistance.

On April 30, 2015, President Obama announced his nomination of Smith to be the new administrator for the U.S. Agency for International Development (USAID), to succeed Dr. Rajiv Shah, who resigned the post in February 2015. Despite some opposition to her appointment, and a delayed Senate confirmation, Smith was confirmed on November 30, 2015.

As Administrator of the United States Agency for International Development (USAID), Smith's focus was on development and international affairs.

Smith has worked as a consultant to various non-governmental agencies like the Cooperation Canada (formerly the Canadian Council for International Cooperation), Dutch Interchurch Aid, Norwegian Church Relief, UNICEF, the World Bank, among others.

On March 28, 2017, Smith joined the Bono's ONE Campaign, succeeding Michael J. Elliott.

On March 5, 2021, it was announced that Smith would be the coordinator of the global COVID response and health security at the U.S. Department of State, where she focused on COVID financing, capacity, and global efforts to distribute COVID vaccines equitably. As part of this program, Smith worked on the 2021 COVAX Investment Opportunity, an approach to funding the World Health Organization's COVAX Facility, which provides vaccinations to low- and middle-income countries. She returned to ONE on December 6, 2021.

Selected membership
 Acumen Fund, Acumen Fund Advisory Council
 Africa-America Institute, Board Member
 Center for a New American Security, Advisory Board Member
 ASSET Campaign, Founding Board Member
 Council on Foreign Relations, Board Member
 DATA/ONE Campaign, Advisory Board Member
 Global Fairness Initiative, Advisory Board Member
 National Security Network, Board Member
 Oxfam America, Board Member
 USA for Africa, Board Member

Selected awards
 1989: World Affairs Council, World Journalism Award
 1991: World Hunger Year Award
 1999: U.S. National Security Council, Samuel Nelson Drew Award for Distinguished Contribution in Pursuit of Global Peace

Selected works and publications

References

External links

Gayle Smith's Subject Files, 2009 - 2017 at the U.S. National Archives

1956 births
Administrators of the United States Agency for International Development
Bexley High School alumni
Living people
Obama administration personnel
United States National Security Council staffers
University of Colorado Boulder alumni